Pranav Mohanlal (born 13 July 1990) is an Indian actor who works in Malayalam films. The son of actor Mohanlal, began his acting career as a child artist in Onnaman (2002) with his father in the lead role, and won the Kerala State Film Award for Best Child Artist for Punarjani (2003). He later assisted Jeethu Joseph on Papanasam and Life of Josutty. He made his acting debut in a lead role with action thriller Aadhi (2018), which emerged as one of the highest-grossing Malayalam films of the year and fetched him the SIIMA Award for Best Debut Actor. He achieved further critical and commercial success with Vineeth Sreenivasan's coming-of-age film Hridayam (2022).

Early life
Pranav Mohanlal was born on 13 July 1990 in Thiruvananthapuram, Kerala in India as the son of actor Mohanlal and Suchitra Balaji. He has a younger sister, Vismaya Mohanlal. His maternal grandfather is the Tamil film producer K. Balaji and his maternal uncle Suresh Balaje is also a producer.

Pranav completed his schooling from a boarding school, the Hebron School, in Ooty, Tamilnadu. He graduated with a bachelor's degree in philosophy from the University of New South Wales in Australia. Pranav maintains a low profile and is known for avoiding the media. He explained, "I don't hate media. It is just that I believe that people have nothing to gain from knowing my personal life".
Following his father's skills, Pranav learnt Martial Arts and is a trained Parkour. His Parkour moves were used in action thriller Aadhi.

Career
Pranav made his screen debut in 2002, appearing in a minor role in the action crime drama Onnaman, starring his father Mohanlal and directed by Thampi Kannanthanam. He played the childhood version of his father's character Ravisankar. In the same year, he acted in his first leading role in Punarjani, a drama directed by Major Ravi and Rajesh Amanakara. He played Appu, a troubled child who ran away from home thinking his parents love his younger brother more than him. His performance earned him the Kerala State Film Award for Best Child Artist. After that, he took a break to concentrate on his education. In between, he made a cameo appearance in a song in Sagar Alias Jacky Reloaded in 2009. Director Priyadarshan, who is also their family friend said in an interview: "He is a terrific actor. I have seen him act in plays in school and he was selected as the best actor too ... But now, he says he does not want to be [in] cinema".

In 2014, Pranav began working as an assistant director under Jeethu Joseph in the Tamil film Papanasam (2015), starring Kamal Haasan, a remake of Jeethu's Malayalam film, Drishyam that starred his father, Mohanlal. He continued working as an assistant in Jeethu's subsequent film Life of Josutty (2015) before departing. In September 2016, it was announced that he would be returning as an actor in a film to be directed by Jeethu and produced by Aashirvad Cinemas. The action-thriller titled Aadhi began principal photography in August 2017 and was released in January 2018. He wrote, sang and performed the English song "Gypsy Women" in the film. Aadhi received positive response, particularly for Pranav's parkour stunt; the film was a commercial success grossing 35 crore in a month. It was one of the highest-grossing Malayalam films of the year. His second film Irupathiyonnaam Noottaandu directed by Arun Gopy and produced by Tomichan Mulakuppadam was released in 2019, receiving mostly negative reviews.

He appeared in a guest role as young Kunjali Marakkar IV in the Priyadarshan-directed period film Marakkar: Arabikadalinte Simham (2020), starring Mohanlal. In 2020, he began filming Hridayam, written and directed by Vineeth Sreenivasan. Produced under the banner of Merryland Cinemas, it was released worldwide in January 2022 and features Pranav playing the protagonist of the film.The film was blockbuster in box office.

Filmography

Accolades 
Pranav won the Kerala State Film Award for Best Child Artist in 2003 for his performance as a troubled child in the film Punarjani. He won the Best Debut Actor award at the 8th SIIMA and the Kerala Film Critics Association Awards for the film Aadhi.

References

External links
 
 
 Instagram Official Fan Page : https://instagram.com/iam.pranavmohanlal?igshid=YmMyMTA2M2Y=

1990 births
Living people
Indian male child actors
Male actors in Malayalam cinema
Indian male film actors
21st-century Indian male actors
Male actors from Thiruvananthapuram
Hebron School alumni
University of New South Wales alumni
Kerala State Film Award winners
Indian Hindus
Malayali people
Indian guitarists
Indian male singer-songwriters
Indian singer-songwriters
21st-century guitarists
21st-century Indian male singers
21st-century Indian singers